Oleksandr Oleksandrovich Nadtoka (born 6 March 1991) is a Ukrainian rower. He won the gold medal in the quadruple sculls at the 2014 World Rowing Championships in Amsterdam.

References

External links

1991 births
Living people
Ukrainian male rowers
Sportspeople from Zaporizhzhia
World Rowing Championships medalists for Ukraine
Rowers at the 2016 Summer Olympics
Olympic rowers of Ukraine
Universiade silver medalists for Ukraine
Universiade medalists in rowing
Medalists at the 2013 Summer Universiade
Medalists at the 2015 Summer Universiade
Recipients of the Order of Danylo Halytsky